Norway competed at the 1964 Winter Olympics in Innsbruck, Austria.

Medalists

Alpine skiing

Men

Men's slalom

Women

Biathlon

Men

 1 Two minutes added per miss.

Cross-country skiing

Men

Men's 4 × 10 km relay

Women

Figure skating

Women

Ice hockey

First round
Winners (in bold) qualified for the Group A to play for 1st-8th places. Teams, which lost their qualification matches, played in Group B for 9th-16th places.

|}

Consolation Round 

Japan 4-3 Norway
Poland 4-2 Norway
Norway 9-2 Italy
Norway 5-1 Hungary
Norway 4-2 Romania
Austria 2-8 Norway
Norway 8-4 Yugoslavia

Luge

Men

(Men's) Doubles

Nordic combined 

Events:
 normal hill ski jumping 
 15 km cross-country skiing

Ski jumping

Speed skating

Men

References
 Official Olympic Reports
 International Olympic Committee results database
 Olympic Winter Games 1964, full results by sports-reference.com

Nations at the 1964 Winter Olympics
1964
1964 in Norwegian sport